Bagavathi is a 2002 Indian Tamil-language action film written and directed by A. Venkatesh, which features Vijay and Reemma Sen. Jai, Vadivelu, Ashish Vidyarthi, K. Vishwanath, and Yugendran play supporting roles, while Deva composed the music for the film. The movie was released on 4 November 2002 during Diwali. The film was a commercial hit at the box office. The film was remade in Kannada as Kashi from Village (2005).

Plot 
Bagavathi owns a tea shop, while Vadivelu, works at his tea shop. Bagavathi lives with his younger brother Guna. He meets a girl named Anjali. She ends up appreciating his kindness, and they fall in love. Guna has a girlfriend named Priya, with whom he secretly develops a physical relationship. Guna's love is objected to by Priya's father, Easwarapandiyan. Bagavathi tries to convince Easwarapandiyan to let Priya and Guna marry, but is humiliated. Guna attempts to marry Priya with his brother's help, but Easwarapandiyan kills Guna, as well as Bagavathi's friend Anand, who is trying to defend Guna.

Bagavathi mourns over Guna's death. Guna, in his last moments, promises he will be with his brother forever. After Guna's death, everyone realises that Priya is pregnant. Bagavathi thinks that Guna will be reborn again. However, Easwarapandiyan attempts to kill the child before birth. Bagavathi challenges him, saying the child will touch the earth. In order to do so, Ganga helps him turn into a gangster. With the help of Anjali and Vadivelu, Bagavathi overcomes all hurdles by Easwarapandiyan and manages to protect Priya to allow for the safe birth of his brother's child. In the end, Bagavathi avenges the death of his brother by killing Easwarapandian.

Cast

Production 
The director A. Venkatesh selected a newcomer, Jai, to play the role of Guna after seeing him at Jai's uncle, Deva's, recording studio — mentioning that the youngster looked like actor Vijay. Although his role in the film was relatively minimal, he has since gone on to appear in successful films such as Chennai 600028, Subramaniyapuram and Engeyum Eppodhum.

The film was shot at various locations including Chennai, Nellore, Araku Valley, and Vishakhapatnam. Prior to the title being confirmed as Bagavathi, the maker considered the title Namma Aalu.

Release 
Bagavathi was released in Diwali alongside Villain. The film was released in Malaysia under the title Pasupathy. Ananda Vikatan rated the film 37 out of 100. The Hindu wrote "The film that seemed to move at an interesting pace makes a nosedive in the climax [..]".

Soundtrack 

The soundtrack consists of six songs composed by Deva. The lyrics were written by Vaali, Snehan, Pa. Vijay, Kalaikumar, and Na. Muthukumar. The song "Kai.. Kai.." is a remix of the song "Ranu raanu" from telugu movie Jayam.

References

External links 
 

2002 films
2000s crime action films
2000s Tamil-language films
2000s masala films
Films scored by Deva (composer)
Indian crime action films
Indian films about revenge
Indian gangster films
Tamil films remade in other languages
Films directed by A. Venkatesh (director)